Dyenmonus bimaculicollis is a species of beetle in the family Cerambycidae. It was described by Stephan von Breuning in 1956.

References

Saperdini
Beetles described in 1956